Aulacoscelis is a genus of leaf beetles in the family Orsodacnidae. There are at least two described species in Aulacoscelis.

Species
These two species belong to the genus Aulacoscelis:
 Aulacoscelis candezei Chapuis, 1874 i c g b
 Aulacoscelis vogti Monrós, 1959 i c g
Data sources: i = ITIS, c = Catalogue of Life, g = GBIF, b = Bugguide.net

References

Further reading

 

Orsodacnidae
Articles created by Qbugbot